Below is a list of destinations US Airways flew to at the time of its merger with American Airlines. The list does not include cities only served by US Airways Express, for those destinations see List of US Airways Express destinations.

List

References

Lists of airline destinations
Destinations